Sébastien Vassoney (born 26 September 1975) is a French snowboarder. He competed in the men's halfpipe event at the 2002 Winter Olympics.

References

1975 births
Living people
French male snowboarders
Olympic snowboarders of France
Snowboarders at the 2002 Winter Olympics
Sportspeople from Manchester
21st-century French people